The Glenfinnan Viaduct is a railway viaduct on the West Highland Line in Glenfinnan, Inverness-shire, Scotland, built from 1897 to 1901. Located at the top of Loch Shiel in the West Scottish Highlands, the viaduct overlooks the Glenfinnan Monument and the waters of Loch Shiel.

Construction

 The Glenfinnan Viaduct, however, was complete enough by October 1898 to be used to transport materials across the valley. It was built at a cost of £18,904.

A long-established legend attached to the Glenfinnan Viaduct was that a horse had fallen into one of the piers during construction in 1898 or 1899. In 1987, Professor Roland Paxton failed to find evidence of a horse at Glenfinnan using a fisheye camera inserted into boreholes in the only two piers large enough to accommodate a horse. In 1997, on the basis of local hearsay, he investigated the Loch nan Uamh Viaduct by the same method but found the piers to be full of rubble. Using scanning technology in 2001, the remains of the horse and cart were found at Loch nan Uamh, within the large central pylon.

Design

The concrete used in the Glenfinnan Viaduct is mass concrete, which unlike reinforced concrete does not contain any metal reinforcement. It is formed by pouring concrete, typically using fine aggregate, into formwork, resulting in a material very strong in compression but weak in tension.

Services
The West Highland Line connects Fort William and Mallaig, and was a crucial artery for the local fishing industry and the highlands economy in general, which suffered enormously after the Highland Clearances of the 1800s. 

The line is used by passenger trains operated by ScotRail between Glasgow Queen Street and Mallaig, with Class 153 and Class 156 diesel multiple units. In the summer, West Coast Railways operates The Jacobite steam train along the line. It is a popular tourist event in the area, and the viaduct is one of the major attractions of the line. The Royal Scotsman also operates on the line.

Depiction

Glenfinnan Viaduct has been used as a location in several films and television series, including Ring of Bright Water,  Charlotte Gray, Monarch of the Glen, Stone of Destiny, The Crown, and four of the Harry Potter films. After its appearance in Harry Potter, British Transport Police had to warn fans not to walk on the viaduct after a handful of near misses with trains had occurred. It is also featured in the 2018 videogame Forza Horizon 4.

The Glenfinnan Viaduct features on some Scottish banknotes. The 2007 series of notes issued by the Bank of Scotland depicts different bridges in Scotland as examples of Scottish engineering, and the £10 note features the Glenfinnan Viaduct.

References

Sources

External links

Bridges completed in 1901
Bridges in Highland (council area)
Category A listed buildings in Highland (council area)
Concrete bridges in the United Kingdom
Listed bridges in Scotland
Lochaber
Railway bridges in Scotland
Viaducts in Scotland
1901 establishments in Scotland